Ivaylo Kirov (born 30 December 1965) is a former Bulgarian footballer who played as a midfielder. He earned 12 caps for the Bulgarian national team, scoring one goal.

Born in Shumen, Kirov began his career with local side Volov Shumen. In 1984, he joined CSKA Sofia, where he spent the majority of his playing career. With CSKA Kirov won four A Group titles, five Bulgarian Cups, four Cups of the Soviet Army and one Bulgarian Supercup.

Kirov also played for Norwegian side Lillestrøm SK in the Tippeligaen and Velbazhd Kyustendil.

Honours

Club
CSKA Sofia
 A Group (4): 1986–87, 1988–89, 1989–90, 1991–92
 Bulgarian Cup (5): 1985, 1987, 1988, 1989, 1993
 Cup of the Soviet Army (4): 1985, 1986, 1989, 1990
 Bulgarian Supercup (1): 1989

References

External links

1965 births
Living people
Bulgarian footballers
Bulgaria international footballers
Bulgaria youth international footballers
Bulgarian expatriate footballers
PFC CSKA Sofia players
Lillestrøm SK players
PFC Velbazhd Kyustendil players
First Professional Football League (Bulgaria) players
Eliteserien players
Bulgarian expatriate sportspeople in Norway
Expatriate footballers in Norway
People from Shumen
Association football midfielders